The Becoming may refer to:
The Becoming (EP), an EP by After Midnight Project
The Becoming (album), a 2013 album by Jenny Simmons
The Becoming (Grey's Anatomy), an episode of Grey's Anatomy
"The Becoming", a song from the Nine Inch Nails album The Downward Spiral